Bojszów  (formerly German Boitschow) is a village in the administrative district of Gmina Rudziniec, within Gliwice County, Silesian Voivodeship, in southern Poland.
The village has a population of 957.
www.bojszow.pl

References

Villages in Gliwice County